Charles Hamilton Newman (May 27, 1938 - March 15, 2006) was an American writer, editor and dog breeder, best known for the novel White Jazz.

Life
Charles Newman was born in St. Louis, Missouri, which his family had lived in since "it was a little village of French and Spanish inhabitants." However, after World War Two his father, a furniture salesman, moved Newman and his mother to a suburban housing tract north of Chicago, next to a horseradish bottling plant. A renowned high school athlete, Newman attended North Shore Country Day School in Winnetka, Illinois and led the school to championships in football, basketball and baseball.

At Yale University, Newman won the Bellamy Prize for best thesis in American history and dated author Carol Brightman; his best friend was the author Leslie Epstein. A Woodrow Wilson fellow and Fulbright recipient, he went on to study at Balliol College, Oxford, and spent time in the Air Force Reserve. After his discharge, he worked for Congressman Sidney R. Yates.

In 1963, Newman became an instructor in the English department at Northwestern University and took over the campus literary magazine, known as TriQuarterly, which he soon transformed into "an international journal showcasing the world's most eminent writers." In 1975 he left Northwestern to become director of the Johns Hopkins Writing Seminars, but withdrew from academia soon afterward to raise wirehaired vizslas in the Shenandoah Valley. He returned to teaching in 1985 at Washington University in St. Louis, his birth city, and remained on the faculty there until his death in 2006.

Newman was married four times but had no children.

Writing
Newman's first novel, New Axis, was published in 1966, and portrays the community of King's Kove, an affluent but ahistoric suburb resembling the one in which Newman grew up. The New York Times faulted New Axis for its "uncritical affection" toward a community that is "so bleak . . . that to come upon it even in a book is to be oppressed by its narrowness." However, Time called the book's satire "subtle and precise," and praised Newman's writing as "almost too elegant." Life called New Axis "one of the two or three fiction discoveries of the year."

Newman's second novel, The Promisekeeper, was published in 1971, and followed by A Child's History of America, a memoir of traveling in Europe and America in 1968. His other fiction includes a trio of novellas (There Must Be More to Love than Death) and White Jazz, a best-selling novel selected as one of the 100 Notable Books of 1984 by The New York Times.

The Post-Modern Aura
Newman's best-known work is The Post-Modern Aura, a scathing critique of contemporary culture that, unusually for a work of criticism, was reviewed and discussed in over thirty magazines, including general interest publications such as Time. Newman's thesis is that post-modernism is characterized "not by style or particular intent, but by pure velocity," and that the acceleration of virtually everything in postmodern life, from the number of poetry collections published each year to the increasing value of the dollar, has created "cultural incoherence of the most destructive sort." The book was keenly praised by Christopher Lasch, Robert Hughes, Robert Boyers and other critics.

Triquarterly
Under Newman, TriQuarterly offered an alternative to the conventional literary magazine of its time by combining adventurous taste in fiction (especially by American postmodern writers such as William Gass and Robert Coover), literature from abroad (in particular the Eastern Bloc and what was then the Third World), and critical theory, all packaged within an art-focused (as opposed to merely decorative) design. Early contributors included E. M. Cioran (translated into English for the first time), Susan Sontag, Richard Brautigan, Ian McEwan, Mario Vargas Llosa, Czesław Miłosz, Fredric Jameson, John Hawkes, Tom McGuane and Joyce Carol Oates, with whole issues devoted to Borges and Nabokov, among others. Contributing artists included Aaron Siskind and Leonard Baskin. Later editors from Bill Buford to Daniel Halpern have cited the influence of the early TriQuarterly.

Awards and honors
Morton Dauwen Zabel Award, National Institute of Arts and Letters, 1975
Guggenheim Fellowship, 1974–75
Rockefeller Grant for Creative Writing Fellowship, 1973
National Endowment for Creative Writing Fellowship, 1974
Best American Short Stories, 1972, 1977
Woodrow Wilson Fellowship 1960-61
Fulbright Grant, 1961–62

Works

Novels
New Axis, Houghton Mifflin Company, 1966
The Promisekeeper, Simon and Schuster, 1971
There Must Be More to Love Than Death, The Swallow Press, 1976
White Jazz, Doubleday, 1983
In Partial Disgrace, Dalkey Archive, 2013

Nonfiction
A Child's History of America, The Swallow Press, 1973
The Post-Modern Aura, Northwestern University Press, 1985

Books edited
The Art of Sylvia Plath, Indiana University Press, 1970
New Writing from East Europe, Indiana University Press, 1970
New American Writers Under 30, Indiana University Press, 1970
Nabokov: Criticism and Reminiscences, Translation and Tributes, Simon and Schuster, 1971
Literature in Revolution, Northwestern University Press, 1974
Prose for Borges, Northwestern University Press, 1974

References
Notes

Further reading

External links
 Boyers, Robert. "A Beauty," Agni 74, 2011. https://web.archive.org/web/20120721064634/http://www.bu.edu/agni/essays/print/2011/74-boyers.html
 Newman, Charles. "Minor Aspirations and Mock Debate" TriQuarterly 1, 1964. Republished in A Public Space. http://www.apublicspace.org/news/minor_aspirations_and_mock_debate.html

Postmodern writers
Writers from Chicago
Novelists from Missouri
20th-century American novelists
21st-century American novelists
American male novelists
American editors
American literary critics
Writers from St. Louis
Yale University alumni
Washington University in St. Louis faculty
Fellows of the American Academy of Arts and Sciences
1938 births
2006 deaths
Novelists from Illinois
21st-century American non-fiction writers
American male non-fiction writers
20th-century American male writers
21st-century American male writers